Andalucía is a town and municipality located in the north of the Department of Valle del Cauca, in Colombia.

External links
 Andalucia official website

References

Municipalities of Valle del Cauca Department